Rafael Alejandro Micalco Méndez (born 21 January 1970) is a Mexican politician affiliated with the PAN. He currently serves as Deputy of the LXII Legislature of the Mexican Congress representing Puebla.

References

1970 births
Living people
People from San Luis Potosí City
Members of the Congress of Puebla
National Action Party (Mexico) politicians
21st-century Mexican politicians
Deputies of the LXII Legislature of Mexico
Members of the Chamber of Deputies (Mexico) for Puebla